Gürsu is a town and district of Bursa Province of Turkey. The Mayor of Gürsu is Mustafa Işık.

References

Populated places in Bursa Province
Districts of Bursa Province